The S9 is a railway service of the St. Gallen S-Bahn that provides half-hourly service between  and  over the Wil–Ebnat-Kappel line. THURBO, a joint venture of Swiss Federal Railways and the canton of Thurgau, operates the service.

Operations 

Route 

  – 

 Wil SG
 
 
 
 
 
 Wattwil

History 
With the timetable change, the S9 was cut back to its present terminus and the S8 extended to Nesslau-Neu St. Johann.

References

External links 

 Fahrplan Ost

St. Gallen S-Bahn lines
Transport in the canton of St. Gallen